Lydia Manon (born September 16, 1982, in Reading, PA) is an American retired ice dancer. With Ryan O'Meara, she is the 2005 U.S. bronze medalist and Four Continents bronze medalist. They announced the end of their partnership in March 2005.

Manon began skating with Brandon Forsyth in March 2005. They skated together until mid-2006 when she retired to pursue academic studies at the George Washington University. Prior to joining forces with O'Meara in 2003, she competed with Michel Klus.

Currently, Manon is a graduate student in the Slavic Department at the University of Virginia.

Competitive highlights
(with O'Meara)

(with Shalin)

(with Klus)

(with Obzansky)

Programs 
(with O'Meara)

References

External links
 
 

1982 births
American female ice dancers
Living people
Four Continents Figure Skating Championships medalists
21st-century American women